The Central Vipers were a New Zealand rugby league team that represented the Mid-Central Zone in the Albert Baskerville Trophy. The team drew on players from the Hawkes Bay, Manawatu and Taranaki districts. In 2010 the Central Vipers were known as Heartland. The competition was re-organised in 2016 and the districts entered teams in their own right.

References

External links
Heartland NZRL.co.nz

New Zealand rugby league teams
Rugby league in the Mid Central zone